Bissell Inc., also known as Bissell Homecare, is an American privately owned vacuum cleaner and floor care product manufacturing corporation headquartered in Walker, Michigan in Greater Grand Rapids. The company is the number one manufacturer of floor care products in North America in terms of sales, with 20% marketshare.

History
Melville Bissell developed an early carpet sweeping machine to aid in cleaning the crockery shop he and his wife Anna owned and operated. The device was patented as the Bissell Carpet Sweeper in 1876.  In 1883, Bissell built the company's first manufacturing plant in Grand Rapids. By the 1890s the company had an international presence and was producing 1000 sweepers per day.

Melville Bissell died in 1889 and his wife Anna took over as leader of the company. She served as the company president from 1889 - 1919 and chair of the board from 1919 - 1934.

Over the years the company expanded from manufacturing only mechanical sweepers to producing vacuum cleaners and carpet shampooers.

Today
In 2004, the company acquired a license for the Woolite trademark for all carpet and upholstery cleaning formulas for $62 million. It has also moved into the pet-care industry, manufacturing attachments and solutions designed specifically for cleaning up pet hair and stains. Whereas other competitors saw sales decline by numerous percentage points during the economic downturn, Bissell's sales remained steady. In 2009, they outpaced Hoover to take the number one position for floor-care sales in North America. Their top-selling carpet shampooer is Bissell ProHeat 2x Revolution Pet Pro which is the market leader as of 2020.

They were the title sponsor for the Bissell Pro Cycling Team. Bissell also has a pet foundation. With every purchase, they donate some percentage to the foundation to save pets, and grant money and assistance to various animal non-profits in all 50 states.

References

External links

 Official Bissell website
 

Vacuum cleaner manufacturers
Manufacturing companies based in Michigan
Companies based in Kent County, Michigan
American companies established in 1876
Manufacturing companies established in 1876
1876 establishments in Michigan
Privately held companies based in Michigan
Home appliance manufacturers of the United States
American brands
Family-owned companies of the United States